Julian Nils Christoph Pahlke (born 15 October 1991) is a German politician of Alliance 90/The Greens who has been serving as a member of the Bundestag in the 2021 German federal election.

Early career
Pahlke was a crew member of the ship Iuventa of the organization Jugend Rettet for several years. From 2020 to 2021, he worked as parliamentary assistant to Claudia Roth.

Political career
Pahlke became a member of the German Bundestag in 2021, representing the Unterems district.

In parliament, Pahlke has been serving on the Committee on Internal Affairs and Community and the Committee on European Affairs.

In addition to his committee assignments, Pahlke has been a member of the German delegation to the Parliamentary Assembly of the Council of Europe (PACE) since 2022. In the Assembly, he serves on the Committee on Migration, Refugees and Displaced Persons and the Sub-Committee on Migrant Smuggling and Trafficking in Human Beings.

References

External links 
 

Living people
1991 births
Place of birth missing (living people)
21st-century German politicians
Members of the Bundestag for Alliance 90/The Greens
Members of the Bundestag 2021–2025